Sarah Willoughby may refer to:
 Elizabeth Callaghan (1802-1852), Irish transportee to Australia, later known as Sarah Willoughby
Sarah Willoughby, character in 1944 film Welcome, Mr. Washington